Phelsuma roesleri, also known commonly as Rösler's day gecko, is a species of lizard in the family Gekkonidae. The species is endemic to Madagascar.

Etymology
The specific name, roesleri, is in honor of German herpetologist Herbert Rösler (born 1952).

Geographic range
P. roesleri is found in the Diana Region of extreme northern Madagascar.

Habitat

Description

References

Further reading
Glaw F, Gehring P-S, Köhler J, Franzen M, Vences M (2010). "A new dwarf species of day gecko, genus Phelsuma, from the Ankarana pinnacle karst in northern Madagascar". Salamandra 46 (2): 83–92. (Phelsuma roesleri, new species).
Glaw F, Rösler H (2015). "Taxonomic check list of the day geckos of the genera Phelsuma Gray, 1825 and Rhoptropella Hewitt, 1937 (Squamata: Gekkonidae)". Vertebrate Zoology 65 (2): 247–283. (Phelsuma roesleri, p. 269).

Phelsuma
Geckos of Africa
Reptiles of Madagascar
Endemic fauna of Madagascar
Reptiles described in 2010
Taxa named by Frank Glaw
Taxa named by Miguel Vences